François-Antoine-Eugène de Planard (4 February 1783 – 13 November 1853), known as just Eugène de Planard, was a 19th-century French playwright.

His daughter Eugénie (1818–1874) married the dramatist and librettist Adolphe de Leuven (1802–1884).

Works (selection) 
 1832: , opéra comique in three acts after Prosper Mérimée, music by Ferdinand Hérold, Opéra-Comique (15 December)
 1835: , opéra-comique in three acts with Jules-Henri Vernoy de Saint-Georges, music by Jacques-Fromental Halévy, Opéra-Comique (16 December)
 1837: , opéra comique in one act, music by Ambroise Thomas, Opéra-Comique (23 August)
 1837:  with Saint-Georges, music by George Onslow, Opéra-Comique (8 September) 
 1838: , opéra comique in three acts with Paul Duport, music by Ambroise Thomas, Opéra-Comique (30 March)
 1852: , opéra comique, music by Adolphe Adam, Opéra-Comique (19 March)

Bibliography 
 

19th-century French dramatists and playwrights
People from Millau
1783 births
1853 deaths